Anni Helena Takalo (née Kivioja, born 28 October 1947) is a Finnish former cross-country skier. She was born in Nivala, and was dominant women's cross-country skiing in the 1970s, earning five Winter Olympic medals and four FIS Nordic World Ski Championships medals (golds in 5 km and 4 × 5 km relay (both 1978), and bronzes in 3 × 5 km relay (1970), 10 km (1974), and 20 km (1978).).

Takalo also won the women's 5 km at the Holmenkollen ski festival in 1976. For her cross-country skiing successes, she earned the Holmenkollen medal in 1977 (Shared with Hilkka Riihivuori and Walter Steiner).

Cross-country skiing results
All results are sourced from the International Ski Federation (FIS).

Olympic Games
 5 medals – (1 gold, 3 silver, 1 bronze)

World Championships
 5 medals – (2 gold, 3 bronze)

World Cup

Season standings

References

 Holmenkollen medalists - click Holmenkollmedaljen for downloadable pdf file 
 Holmenkollen winners since 1892 - click Vinnere for downloadable pdf file

External links
 

1947 births
Living people
People from Nivala
Cross-country skiers at the 1968 Winter Olympics
Cross-country skiers at the 1972 Winter Olympics
Cross-country skiers at the 1976 Winter Olympics
Cross-country skiers at the 1980 Winter Olympics
Finnish female cross-country skiers
Holmenkollen medalists
Holmenkollen Ski Festival winners
Olympic cross-country skiers of Finland
Olympic medalists in cross-country skiing
FIS Nordic World Ski Championships medalists in cross-country skiing
Medalists at the 1976 Winter Olympics
Medalists at the 1980 Winter Olympics
Medalists at the 1972 Winter Olympics
Olympic gold medalists for Finland
Olympic silver medalists for Finland
Olympic bronze medalists for Finland
Sportspeople from North Ostrobothnia
20th-century Finnish women